is a Japanese anime television series animated by Sunrise. It aired on Wowow from July 21, 2000 to February 9, 2001 and a manga adaptation by Nozomi Watase was published by Kadokawa. The story takes place in Japan in 1969 and it is about an orphan girl named Marin Asagi who befriends an alien named Melan Blue.

Brigadoon was directed by Yoshitomo Yonetani and the characters were designed by Takahiro Kimura, both of whom worked on The King of Braves GaoGaiGar and Betterman.

The show's setting in Yayoi, Tokyo was based on neighborhoods in which director Yonetani and art director Takashi Nakamura once lived. Color is a recurring theme in the series as well. Most if not all of the episodes have a color in the title, and nearly everyone in the cast is named after a color in one way or another. Likewise, the rainbow is an important image.

Plot
Marin Asagi is a typical junior high school girl with a loving adoptive family. Her life changes drastically when a mysterious mirage is seen in the sky above the entire Earth. The mirage is actually another world called Brigadoon. Soon, alien creatures called Monomakia descend from the formation in the sky and hunt down Marin, but she is saved by another Monomakia named Melan Blue, a flying, sword-wielding, gun-slinging alien who becomes her protector.

Together, Marin and Melan must save the Earth and deal with family crises, school prejudice and the police, and come to an understanding of Marin's past and Melan's unexplained mission, as well as learn to trust each other.

Characters

Main characters

 Marin is the heroine of the series, a 13-year-old girl in the seventh grade. She was abandoned as a baby at the door of a tenement house and adopted by the elderly couple Gen and Moto Asagi. She is far-sighted and wears glasses to see properly. At school she is often picked on by her peers, but she tries not to let it bother her. In general, she is a happy, energetic girl with a wild imagination and strong work ethic, earning her own money by delivering newspapers. Her life turns messy when Brigadoon appears in the sky and Monomakia start to attack her. The kanji of her family name translates to "light blue".

 Melan was discovered by Marin in an ampoule that was in Nezu Shrine near her house. Originally from Brigadoon, he is a type of Monomakia known as a Gun-Swordsman. He takes on the mission of protecting Marin for reasons he cannot tell her. He is very tall and humanoid in appearance, wears blue armor, and flies with a set of mechanical wings. For combat, he has a sword on his right arm and a laser gun on his left. He uses rice as fuel and can eat up to fifty bowls in one sitting. While he makes an excellent bodyguard, Melan understands little about human beings, but that begins to change as he spends more time among them and bonds with Marin.

 Lolo is a green, cat-like creature from Brigadoon who aids Marin and Melan in their adventures. He appears on Earth shortly before Brigadoon becomes visible in the sky and shows Marin where Melan's ampoule is located. At first he only appears to Marin as a sort of eccentric advisor and even leads her to where the ampoules of other helpful Monomakia are hidden. Later, he is revealed to be the chairman of the Life Improvement Committee of Brigadoon's Central Assembly.

 Moe is Marin's classmate and best friend. She has a weak constitution, is noticeably pale, and is very shy and quiet. She comes from a wealthy family and her mother does not like her associating with the less fortunate Marin. Despite this, Moe remains Marin's most loyal friend and does everything she can to help her. Her efforts are not always successful and she is often worse off afterward, but she believes they are worthwhile. The kanji of her given name comes from the word "moegi", meaning "light yellowish green".

Nicknamed "Aloma" by Marin, he is a mysterious young boy who seems to know a lot about the Monomakias and Brigadoon. Good-looking and polite, he is usually eating something whenever he appears. When Marin first meets him, she assumes that he is an observer from the future, and his response suggests that this might be true. He also has a tendency to show up wherever a Monomakia is about to strike and appears to know more than he lets on.

Tenement house

 Moto is Marin's adoptive grandmother, an energetic widow aged 68 years. She and her late husband Gen found Marin abandoned on the doorstep of the tenement house and decided to keep her. She is a very strong and independent woman who cares about Marin very much and will do anything to protect her. She is also very wise and gives good advice to people.

 Shuta is a 75-year-old inventor who is always building strange machines. When Marin starts getting chased by Monomakia, he creates things that he hopes will keep her safe, but most of them are useless. He is also very curious about both Melan and Brigadoon. The kanji for "ai" in his name means "indigo" in Japanese.

 Mike comes from America and is 22 years old. He is Shuta's assistant but his skill with the Japanese language is weak and his dialogue is filled with English words. He secretly has a crush on Jun, though it remains to be seen how she feels about him.

 These identical triplets are 45 years old and run a candy shop from the house. They usually talk and act in sync with each other. A running gag of the series is that they will each offer a different refreshment to a guest as a form of competition. The kanji for "momo" in their name means "peach".

 Usually called Onando, he is a 35-year-old wood carver who never speaks and communicates entirely through hand gestures and body language. The kanji of his family name comes from the word "nandoiro", meaning "grayish blue".

 Tadashi is 48 years old, unemployed and an alcoholic. Constantly drunk, he can often be found lying outside the house with a bottle of sake. His wife Miyuki left him because he drank too much, and if reminded about her he'll start crying. The kanji for "toki" in his name comes from "tokiiro", which is a shade of pink named after the wing color of the Japanese crested ibis.

 Jun is the 22-year-old daughter of Tadashi Tokita, who works as a nurse. She is very kind and gentle, but is often exasperated by her father's excessive drinking. She thinks of Marin as a little sister, who in turn looks up to her. However, Jun has a secret love life that soon brings problems for her.

Yayoi Junior High

 Chiasa is 23 years old and Marin's homeroom teacher. She is a kind young woman who shows enthusiasm for her work and praises Marin when she does well, but seems unable to prevent her from being bullied. The character for "kuri" in her name means "chestnut color"

 Midori is a ninth grade student (about 16) and a juvenile delinquent. She skips classes, carries a wooden sword for fights, and gets arrested often. Despite this, she becomes friends with Marin and often protects her from danger. Her given name means "emerald green".

 Isshin is an obnoxious kid who loves to tease Marin. He especially likes lifting her skirt to look at her underwear. His family name literally translates to "thin or diluted ink".

 Better known as Tanzen, he is a bit of a bad boy and friends with Isshin. He does not pick on Marin as much, but is still quite rude to her. The "tan" character in his name comes from a word describing a particular shade of vermillion red.

 Kabamoto is a large tough-looking boy who hangs out with Isshin and Tanzen but does not pick on Marin at all. Even when she is blamed for the problems caused by Monomakia, he keeps a clear head and does not believe the rumors. The "kaba" character in his name comes from "kabairo", meaning a shade of reddish yellow.

 The president of Marin's class, Hanazono can be quite bossy and impatient but is not a truly mean person and usually just ignores Marin. On the rare occasions when they meet outside of school, she can be unexpectedly nice. Her given name means "violet".

 The leader of a trio of girls who are especially cruel, she is never called by name in the show. When Monomakia start causing problems and hurting people she is quick to blame Marin for it and threaten her with physical violence. Unlike the rest of the cast, she has no color associated with her name.

 This is one of A-ko's sidekicks. She has pigtails and always seems to be laughing at other people's misfortune. The word "ebicha" means "maroon" in Japanese.

 This is A-ko's other sidekick. She is chubby and pale and always agrees with everything her companions say. The symbol for "kon" in her name means "navy blue".

Historical figures
 Prime Minister Eisaku Sato
 Eisaku Sato was the Prime Minister of Japan at the time of the series. When Brigadoon appears and Monomakia attack Tokyo, he realizes that Marin and Melan are the only ones capable of dealing with the problem and gives orders for the police not to interfere with their activities.

 President Richard Nixon
 Richard Nixon was the President of the United States at the time of the series. He learns about Marin and Melan's involvement with the Brigadoon crisis and goes to Japan to request their help.

 Crew of Apollo 11
 Neil Armstrong, Edwin "Buzz" Aldrin and Michael Collins were astronauts who achieved the first manned space flight to the Moon in the Apollo 11 rocket. In the series, their mission is changed to an expedition to Brigadoon.

Important Monomakia

 Known as the strongest of the Gun-Swordsmen, Pyon believes Melan is a traitor and is out to kill him. He follows a moral code similar to bushido. He calls his sword Excalibur, and his gun is a Gatling gun.

 Erin is a female Gun-Swordsman who, like Pyon, believes Melan is a traitor and tries to kill him. She is ruthless and aggressive. Her sword is a rapier, and she launches disk weapons which can be used as shields and to reflect her lasers. Her face-guard covers only her nose and mouth.

 Kuston is a fourth Gun-Swordsman who was created to replace Melan. Not only is he a newer model, but thanks to the Renegade he has illegal biological alterations. His body can absorb energy attacks and heals from injuries almost instantly. His sword has a clip point, sawtoothed blade and the eyepiece of his face-guard covers his left eye instead of his right.

 This is the second Monomakia to become Marin's ally, a transport Monomakia that looks like a large, purple turtle. His ampoule was found by Marin and Moe on a night at the beach. The only word he can say is "kyu". His shell is a transparent bubble that can hold up to two people at once, and he can convert his limbs into legs or flippers to travel on land or underwater. His head can also be ejected from the rest of his body and piloted with remote control.

 This is the third Monomakia that becomes Marin's ally. She is a gigantic, beastly female Combat Monomakia with a gold, armor-plated body and a long mane of red hair. Her ampoule was discovered by Marin in an exhibit at the World Expo in Osaka. She is animalistic and speaks only by roaring and growling. She is incredibly strong, able to throw around and tear apart enemies who are much bigger than her. She can also shoot slicing hydraulic jets from her palms and consumes water as fuel.

Brigadoon Central Assembly

 Lili is an elderly female with brown fur and has a face on both sides of her head. She is the chairman of the Brigadoon Central Assembly.

 Lala is a young female with pink fur. She is the chairman of the Ecological Control Committee and has invented at least two useful Monomakia for long distance observation. She is a friend of Lolo and has a tendency to hit people with pies when they annoy her.

 Lulu is a male with blue fur. He is the chairman of the Time and Space Observation Committee and also a friend of Lolo and Lala. He likes to eat and complains about Lala wasting food when she flings pies around.

 Lele is a male with gray fur. He is the chairman of the Pasca Executive Committee. He doesn't get along with Lolo or his friends and seems to have a hidden agenda. He also throws pies at people when he gets mad.

Glossary
 - Once every 100 years, the worlds of Brigadoon and Earth share a dimensional space bubble. This phenomenon causes a dangerous event called Mutual Collapse.
 - Also known as Bionic Machines. The Monomakia are creatures engineered by the inhabitants of Brigadoon, each of which is created for a specific purpose such as combat, assassination, transportation, etc. Some are more organic than others.
 - A small container much like a bottle that holds individual Monomakia when they are inactive. Ampoules also serve as life support systems and regenerative units for the Monomakia inside.
 - A phenomenon of space-time disturbances caused when Earth and Brigadoon make dimensional contact.
 - The primary antagonistic force of the series. A political faction that seeks to disrupt the Pasca Ritual and thus bring about the destruction of both Earth and Brigadoon.
 - A dangerous ritual that should not happen, and is a sort of last resort for saving the worlds and restoring stability. The falling of the Tower of Bronte to Earth alerted Melan that the Day of Pasca was coming near.
 - A key element for the Pasca Ritual. Marin is believed to be the Creis, which makes her the target of many a hostile Monomakia.
 - A nickname for Earth used by the inhabitants of Brigadoon.
 - A third world that exists between Earth and Brigadoon. It can be accessed only when the two worlds are near each other, but it is not affected by Mutual Collapse.

Episode list
 出会いは浅葱色 (Blue-Colored Introduction)
 紺碧なるモノマキア (Deep Blue Monomakia)
 鈍色き雲間から (From Dark Gray Clouds)
 虹をもとめて (Searching for the Rainbow)
 ソーダ色の空の下 (Under the Soda-Colored Sky)
 銀灰の訪人 (The Silver Gray Visitor)
 赫赫たる決戦 (The Brilliant Battle)
 海が紫紺に染まる時(The Night When the Sea Turns Dark Blue)
 ピンク・フライト(Pink Flight)
 大怪獣、燦爛!(The Giant Monster's Brilliance)
 やぶれた傘、闇の雨(A Broken Umbrella and the Dark Rain)
 漆黒からの巣立ち(Fly From the Darkness)
 天井暗黒世界(The Dark Celestial World)
 千紫万紅の果てに…(Lost In Colors)
 極彩サヴマトン・カラー(Gorgeous Submaton Color)
 金ぴかの約束(The Golden Promise)
 未来色をさがせ!(Find the Color of the Future!)
 私は茜に輝いて(Glowing Red)
 仄かな破滅を運ぶ船(The Ship That Brings Destruction)
 雪あかりの下で(In the Light of Snow)
 萌葱色、永遠に…(Eternal Green)
 赤錆びた壁を越えて(Breaking Through the Red-Stained Wall)
 褐色の化身(The Dark Transformation)
 命はかくも透きとおり(Translucent Life)
 白きパスカの刻(Time of the White Pasca)
 サヨナラは海の碧（まりん・ブルー）(Goodbye, Marine Blue)

Soundtrack
The music for the series was composed by Yoko Ueno and Yuji Yoshino. The soundtrack CDs were released by Japanese label Victor Entertainment on two separate CDs. There was also a Single CD featuring karaoke versions of the opening and closing theme songs. All of the CDs are now out of production.

Original Soundtrack 1
 OP Theme : sung by Ikuko
 銃剣士 Juukenshi - Gun Swordsman
 蒼凰の瓶(アンプル) Souou no Bin (Ampoule) - Bottle of Azure Phoenix
 浅葱色(まりん) Asagi Iro (Marin) - Light Blue
 駆けるモノ Kakeru Mono - The Runner
 絆 Kizuna - Bonds
 愉快なコト Yukai na Koto - Funny Things
 命の色 Inochi no Iro - Color of Life
 生活向上委員長(ロロ) Seikatsu Kojo Iincho (Lolo) - The Chairman of Life Improvement
 いつものコト Itsumo no Koto - Routine Things
 一騎討ち(モノマキア) Ikki-Uti (Monomakia) - Single Combat
 黄金獣(クシャトーン) Oogonju (Kushatohn) - The Golden Beast
 不思議な喜び(サヴマトン・カラー) Fushigi na Yorokobi (Submaton Colour) - Strange Joy
 楽しいコト Tanoshii Koto - Fun Things
 愛しいコト Itoshii Koto - Things to Cherish
 ふたり Futari - The Two
 不透明 Futoumei - Opaque
 紺碧(メラン) Konpeki (Melan) - Deep Blue
 天井世界(ブリガドーン) Tenjo Sekai (Brigadoon) - The Ceiling World
 心 Kokoro - Heart
 ED Theme : sung by KAORI

Original Soundtrack 2
 風の碧,海の翠(アカペラ・ヴァージョン) Kaze no ao, umi no midori (A cappella version) - Blue of the Wind, Green of the Sea
 茜色の眼鏡(コスモスーヤリヤ) Akane Iro no Megane (Cosmos Yariya) - Glasses of Madder Red
 ロロのコト Lolo no Koto - Things About Lolo
 平和な気持ち Heiwa na Kimochi - Peaceful Feeling
 イキモノ Iki Mono - Living Things
 決戦 Kessen - Decisive Battle
 うれしい気持ち Ureshii Kimochi - Delightful Feeling
 生きていくコト Ikiteiku Koto - To Live On
 怯えるモノ Obieru Mono - The Frightened
 想い Omoi - Thoughts
 風と海 Kaze to Umi - Wind and Sea
 虹色の宝物(まりん&萌ヴァージョン)"Niji Iro no Takaramono (Marin & Moe version) - Rainbow Colored Treasure" sung by KAORI and Ayaka Saito
 敵 Teki - Enemy
 さみしい気持ち Samishii Kimochi - Lonely Feeling
 考えるモノ Kangaeru Mono - One Who Thinks
 歩いていこう Aite Ikou - Let's Walk Ahead
 紫色の亀(ポイクン) Murasaki Iro no Kame (Poikun) - The Purple Turtle
 破壊的な色 Hakaiteki na Iro - Destructive Color
 運命 Unmei - Fate
 掟 Okite - Rule
 天駆けるモノ Amatsu Kakeru Mono - One Who Files Across the Sky
 断罪執行(スキアー) Danzai Shikkou (Skia) - Execution
 少女の色 Otome no Iro - Color of Girl
 まりんとメラン Marin to Melan - Marin and Melan
 パスカの日 Pasuka no Hi - Day of Pasca
  sung by KAORI

Single CD
 OP Theme : sung by Ikuko
 ED Theme : sung by KAORI
 Original Karaoke :
 Original Karaoke :

Manga
Unlike many anime titles, the manga for BRIGADOON: marin & μελαν was made to promote the anime. It was created by Nozomi Watase and based on the original concept by Hajime Yatate and Yoshitomo Yonetani. Volume 1 was first published in Japan by Kadokawa Shoten in 2000 followed by Volume 2 in 2001. Both were later translated into English by Tokyopop and printed in 2003. The main characters and the basic plot are essentially the same as in the anime, but the manga is not a completely faithful adaptation and there are some significant differences. It is also much shorter in length, being only two books with five chapters each. The English version uses some terms and names that are different from the ones used in the anime, even though both were translated by the same company.

Volume list

References

External links
 
 Brigadoon: Marin & Melan Official website at Sunrise (archived)
 WOWOW archive
 Brigadoon: Marin & Melan at TokyoPop (archived)

2000 anime television series debuts
2000 manga
Anime with original screenplays
Bandai Namco franchises
Cultural depictions of Buzz Aldrin
Cultural depictions of Neil Armstrong
Cultural depictions of Michael Collins (astronaut)
Cultural depictions of Richard Nixon
Fiction set in 1969
Hideyuki Kurata
Kadokawa Shoten manga
Shōnen manga
Sunrise (company)
Television shows set in Tokyo
Tokyopop titles
Wowow original programming